James Minchin (15 August 1858 – 13 February 1919) was an Australian cricketer. He played one first-class cricket match for Victoria in 1882.

See also
 List of Victoria first-class cricketers

References

External links
 

1858 births
1919 deaths
Australian cricketers
Victoria cricketers
Cricketers from Melbourne